Number 32 (The Royal) Squadron (sometimes abbreviated as No. 32 (TR) Squadron) of the Royal Air Force operates in the VIP and general air transport roles from RAF Northolt in Greater London.

Originally formed in 1916 as part of the Royal Flying Corps, the squadron saw action during the First and Second World Wars with fighter aircraft, but was disbanded in 1969. The Metropolitan Communications Squadron, involved in the VIP transport role, was renamed as No. 32 Squadron at that time. In 1995, the squadron was merged with the Queen's Flight and incorporated 'The Royal' title into its name. At this time the squadron moved from RAF Benson to RAF Northolt, where it remains.

The merger ended the RAF's provision of dedicated VIP transport aircraft; the squadron's aircraft are available to VIP passengers only if not needed for military operations. Two flights within the squadron operate the Dassault Envoy IV CC1 and AgustaWestland AW109 aircraft.

History

Formation and First World War

On 1 July 1916, its commanding officer, Major Lionel Rees, was engaged in a combat with eight German Albatros two-seater aicraft, and although wounded in the leg, managed to scatter the German aircraft, driving down two of the enemy, for which action he was awarded the Victoria Cross.

The squadron continued to fly patrols over the Western Front, including over the Somme and Arras battlefields, for a year before beginning to re-equip with the Airco DH.5, specialising in ground attack missions. These in turn began to be replaced by the S.E.5a in December 1917 which were flown for the rest of the war on fighter and ground attack missions. On 1 April 1918 the squadrons became part of the new Royal Air Force. In March 1919, the squadron returned to the UK as a cadre and disbanded on 29 December 1919. During the war, sixteen aces had served in its ranks. They included: future Air Marshal Arthur Coningham; Walter Tyrrell; Arthur Claydon; John Donaldson; Wilfred Green; Frank Hale; Hubert Jones; William Curphey; Maxmillian Mare-Montembault; and George Lawson.

Inter-war years
No. 32 Squadron reformed on 1 April 1923 at RAF Kenley as a single flight of Sopwith Snipe fighters. A second flight was formed on 10 December 1923 and a third brought the squadron up to strength on 1 June 1924. Gloster Grebes were received at the end of 1924 and were replaced by Gloster Gamecocks two years later. Equipped in succession with Armstrong Whitworth Siskins, Bristol Bulldogs and Gloster Gauntlets, the squadron received the Hawker Hurricane in October 1938.

Second World War
In May 1940, the squadron flew patrols over northern France and took part in the defence of south-east England based at RAF Biggin Hill, but operating daily from their forward airfield at RAF Hawkinge, near Folkestone, during the opening weeks of the Battle of Britain. The squadron moved to northern England at the end of August 1940. The squadron's Hurricanes saw little action throughout 1941, but did attempt, unsuccessfully, to escort the Fairey Swordfish biplanes of 825 Naval Air Squadron during their doomed attempt to stop the German warships ,  and  during the Channel Dash on 12 February 1942. They then carried out a number of night intruder operations before being deployed overseas.

Following Operation Torch, the Anglo-American invasion of North Africa, in December 1942, the squadron deployed with its Hurricanes to Algeria, converting to the Supermarine Spitfire by July 1943. Operations included a deployment to Greece, where it took part in the Greek Civil War from September 1944 to February 1945.

Post-war
After the end of the Second World War, the squadron continued as a fighter unit, flying Spitfires, the de Havilland Vampire and de Havilland Venom from bases in Palestine, Cyprus, Egypt, Persian Gulf, Malta and Jordan. In January 1957, the squadron converted to the English Electric Canberra B.15 bombers at RAF Weston Zoyland, flying these from Cyprus, remaining there until disbanding on 3 February 1969.

VIP transport

The Metropolitan Communications Squadron was formed on 8 April 1944 for VIP air transport by the renaming of No. 510 Squadron.  Simultaneous with No.32 Squadron being disbanded in Cyprus in February 1969, the Metropolitan Communications Squadron was renamed No. 32 Squadron. It operated a variety of aircraft, including Hawker Siddeley Andovers and Westland Whirlwind HC.10 helicopters.

The squadron acquired four HS.125 CC.1 business jets in 1971. These would be supplemented and then replaced by two HS.125 CC.2 delivered in 1973 and six BAe 125 CC3 delivered in 1982 and 1983. Aérospatiale Gazelle helicopters served with the squadron from 1976 onwards. These were replaced by initially two (later three) Eurocopter Twin Squirrels in 1996.

The RAF leased two BAe 146 in 1983 (designated BAe 146 CC1) as a test of their suitability to replace the Andover, which were operated by No. 241 Operational Conversion Unit. Two BAe 146-100 (designated BAe 146 CC2) were purchased in 1984 for the Queen's Flight as a result, with delivery in 1986. A third BAe 146 CC2 was purchased in 1989 and delivered in 1990, although it was subsequently sold in 2002. The BAe 146 provided a 60% increase in range compared with the Andover, and a larger interior capacity for more passengers.

On 1 April 1995, the Queen's Flight, equipped with these BAe 146 CC2, and Wessex HCC.4 helicopters, was merged into No. 32 Squadron to become No. 32 (The Royal) Squadron and moved to RAF Northolt from RAF Benson. Since then, No. 32 Squadron's aircraft have served as transports in several recent conflicts including Operation Granby (Gulf War), Operation Veritas (Afghanistan) and Operation Telic (Iraq 2003). This merger ended the RAF's provision of dedicated VIP transport aircraft: the aircraft of No. 32 Squadron are available to VIP passengers only if not needed for military operations. This was declared officially in 1999, with the Ministry of Defence (MOD) stating: "the principal purpose of 32 Squadron [is] to provide communications and logistical support to military operations; the Squadron's capacity should be based on military needs only; and any royal or other non-military use of ... spare capacity is secondary to its military purpose".

Following a review by the MOD, in 2004 the squadron's aircraft lost their distinctive livery inherited from The Queen's Flight, featuring red flying surfaces. This was due to the concern over the aircraft's vulnerability to terrorist attack.

In May 2005 the Defence Logistics Organisation's Helicopter and Islander Combined (HIC) Integrated Project Team (IPT) awarded AgustaWestland a five-year contract from 1 April 2006 to provide three AgustaWestland AW109E to replace the three Twin Squirrels. This contract was extended on 31 March 2011 to allow two of the AW109E to continue in use for a further year. Two preserved examples of the squadron's Wessex helicopters, originally operated by the Queen's Flight, can be seen at The Helicopter Museum in Weston-super-Mare and Royal Air Force Museum London.

Two additional BAe 146 were purchased in March 2012 from TNT Airways and were refitted by Hawker Beechcraft on behalf of BAE Systems for tactical freight and personnel transport use. The aircraft, designated as the BAe 146 C3, arrived in Afghanistan in April 2013. On 16 March 2015, the squadron's final BAe 125 returned from operations in Afghanistan, and the type's retirement from the RAF was brought forward due to defence budget cuts. Of the final four operational aircraft, three were put up for sale by the MOD, and one was placed on permanent display at RAF Northolt. The decision was made that the aircraft were to be retired from service seven years ahead of their original withdrawal date.

In late 2015, a single AgustaWestland AW109SP (serial number GZ100) was delivered to the squadron to replace the unit's earlier AW109E (ZR322), which was withdrawn the following year.

On 11 October 2017, the MOD announced that Her Majesty The Queen had approved the award of Battle Honours 'Iraq 2003–2011' and 'Libya 2011', both without the right to emblazon, to the squadron.

In 2020, the squadron's two BAe 146 C3 were modified for use in the medical support role, to carry patients and medical personnel into and out of smaller airfields than the RAF's Voyager tanker-transport aircraft.

Future
The Integrated Review has seen the fleet of four BAe 146 retired in March 2022. Shortly before in  February 2022, Defence Equipment and Support announced that the four aircraft would be replaced by two Dassault Falcon 900LX.

One of the BAe 146-100s has been retired to the British Airliner Collection at Duxford, Cambridgeshire, the other joined South Wales Aviation Museum at St Athan in March 2022. The two BAe 146-200s have also been removed from service and will be sold to civilian airline Pionair Australia.

Squadron strength

'A' Flight
Two Dassault Envoy IV CC1
'B' Flight
One AgustaWestland AW109SP

Battle honours 
No. 32 Squadron has received the following battle honours. Those marked with an asterisk (*) may be emblazoned on the squadron standard.

See also
 Spirit of the Few Monument – sculptures of seven of the squadron's Second World War pilots
 Air transport of the British royal family and government
 Air transports of heads of state and government

References

Notes

Bibliography
   
 Halley, James J. The Squadrons of the Royal Air Force & Commonwealth 1918–1988. Tonbridge, Kent, UK: Air Britain (Historians) Ltd., 1988. .
 Hobson, Chris. A brief history of 32 Squadron Royal Air Force. 1986
 Jefford, C.G. RAF Squadrons, a Comprehensive Record of the Movement and Equipment of all RAF Squadrons and their Antecedents since 1912. Shrewsbury, Shropshire, UK: Airlife Publishing, 2001. .
 Lambert, Mark. Jane's All The World's Aircraft 1993–94. Coulsdon, UK: Jane's Data Division, 1993. .
 Lewis, Gwilym Hugh. Wings over the Somme. London: William Kimber, 1976. . (republished by Bridge Books of Wrexham, Wales in 1994. .)
 Moyes, Philip J.R. Bomber Squadrons of the RAF and their Aircraft. London: Macdonald and Jane's, 1964 (2nd edition 1976). .
 Rawlings J.D.R. "History of No. 32 Squadron". Air Pictorial, November 1971, Vol. 33 No. 11. pp. 424–427.
 Rawlings, John. Fighter Squadrons of the RAF and their Aircraft. London: Macdonald and Jane's Publishers Ltd., 1969 (second edition 1976). .
 Shores, Christopher; Franks, Norman & Guest, Russell. Above The Trenches: A Complete Record of the Fighter Aces and Units of the British Empire Air Forces 1915–1920. London: Grub Street, 1990. .
 Unknown. A Short History of No. 32 Squadron Royal Air Force, 1916–1966. Nicosia, Cyprus: Paratiritis Publications, 1966.

External links

 
 No 32 Squadron RFC/RAF 1918
 Squadron histories for nos. 31–35 sqn on rafweb
 No 32 Squadron Aircraft & Markings 1916 – 1931
 No 32 Squadron Aircraft & Markings 1931 – 1969

032 Squadron
Military units and formations established in 1916
032
032 Squadron
1916 establishments in the United Kingdom